is a railway station on the Hakodate Main Line in Hakodate, Hokkaido, Japan, operated by the Hokkaido Railway Company (JR Hokkaido).

Lines
South Hokkaido Railway Company Dōnan Isaribi Tetsudō Line (Normally ends at Goryōkaku, but trains generally serve Hakodate as well)
Hakodate Main Line
Tsugaru-Kaikyō Line (Former)

Hakodate Station is the terminus of the Hakodate Main Line and the former Tsugaru-Kaikyō Line; Hakodate Municipal Transit streetcars stop at the adjacent Hakodate Eki-mae Station.

Train services
In addition to local services, the following long-distance trains serve Hakodate Station.

Hokuto and Super Hokuto limited express to Sapporo

The following services ended in March 2016 due to the Hokkaido Shinkansen's opening From Shin-Hakodate-Hokuto Station to Shin-Aomori Station, which is takes a similar route of the Hakuchō\Super Hakuchō.  All services go through to Tokyo station, which means the two former sleeper trains had to be discontinued due to the Hokkaido Shinkansen's opening. An extension to Sapporo is currently under construction and will be completed in fiscal 2031.

Hakuchō and Super Hakuchō limited express to Shin-Aomori
Cassiopeia and Hokutosei sleeping car limited express to Sapporo and Ueno
Hamanasu sleeping car express to Sapporo and Aomori

Station layout
The station has four platforms serving eight terminating tracks.

History
Hakodate station first opened on 10 December 1902.

The current station building was opened on 21 June 2003.

Shinkansen services stop at Shin-Hakodate-Hokuto Station, approximately 18 km away from Hakodate Station since 26 March 2016, the day the Shinkansen station opened. "Relay" shuttle services (Hakodate liner) using three-car 733 series electric trains operate between Hakodate and Shin-Hakodate-Hokuto Station.

References

External links

 JR Hokkaido station map 

Railway stations in Hakodate
Tsugaru-Kaikyō Line
Railway stations in Japan opened in 1902